is a bedroom community of Tokyo and Yokohama, located in Aoba-ku, Yokohama, Kanagawa Prefecture, Japan. The area is 20 minutes from Shibuya Station on the Tōkyū Den-en-toshi Line and 27 minutes by subway from Yokohama Station on the Yokohama Subway. Known as an upscale enclave, its residents have come to endearingly refer to themselves as Azaminese. It has seen development in recent years. It is located next to the trendy Tama Plaza.

See also
 Azamino Station

Neighborhoods of Yokohama